The Tennis Championships of Honolulu was a tournament for professional female tennis players played on outdoor hardcourts. The event, classified as a $60,000 ITF Women's Circuit tournament, was held in Honolulu, Hawaii, 2018 and 2019.

Past finals

Singles

Doubles

External links
 Official website
 ITF search

ITF Women's World Tennis Tour
Hard court tennis tournaments in the United States
Recurring sporting events established in 2018